The Plant Bath is a historical bath in Ottawa, Ontario, Canada. It was built along with the Champagne Bath in 1924 to try to improve the hygiene and well-being of the city's lower classes. It was named after Frank H. Plant, then mayor of Ottawa. It is located at 930 Somerset Street West at the intersection with Preston Street. It is in the centre of the Italian-Canadian community and near the Chinese-Canadian areas of the city.

In 1994 it was designated a heritage property, but three years later the building was closed for safety reasons.  The brick pillars holding up the roof had eroded and there was some danger that the building could collapse.  Repairs were estimated to cost millions of dollars and the baths remained closed for several years.  After 2000, a project to refurbish the baths and build a new recreation centre attached was launched.  This project cost eight million dollars, including removing the pool from the old building which now contains community meeting halls. Two new pools, hot tub, steam bath, gyms, and other community structures were added to a large new centre attached.  The new Plant Recreation Centre opened in June 2004.

See also
List of designated heritage properties in Ottawa

External links
 Plant Bath homepage

Buildings and structures in Ottawa
Designated heritage properties in Ottawa
Government buildings completed in 1924
Former public baths
Public baths in Canada